Thomas Welbourn "Tim" Wall (13 May 1904 – 26 March 1981) was an Australian cricketer who played eighteen Test matches between 1929 and 1934. On his debut, he took five wickets in the second innings against England in Melbourne.

Wall was a school teacher in Adelaide before and after his cricket career. He died in 1981 after a long battle with Parkinson's disease. Wall's 10–36 in February 1933 remains the best first-class figures recorded in Australia. It is also the only ten-wicket innings ever recorded for South Australia.

Wall's grandson Brett Swain played 23 first-class matches for South Australia from 1994 to 2001.

References

External links

1904 births
1981 deaths
Australia Test cricketers
South Australia cricketers
Deaths from Parkinson's disease
Neurological disease deaths in South Australia
Prospect cricketers
Australian cricketers
Cricketers who have taken five wickets on Test debut
Cricketers who have taken ten wickets in an innings